Chapter Dos: On the Verge is Xtreme's fourth bachata album. The album contained five new tracks, including the single "Vuelve". It also included two singles that peaked on the Billboard Tropical Airplay Chart, "Baby, Baby" which peaked at number 34, and "Devuélveme La Navidad" featuring Carlos & Alejandra which peaked at number 37. The album also contains 10 tracks from Chapter Dos, and the single "Shorty, Shorty" from Haciendo Historia. This album was either a sequel or a remake of the Chapter Dos album. On the Verge was a reality show that aired on Mun2 in 2009. The album is probably based on the reality show and the previous album.

Track listing

References

Xtreme (group) albums
2009 albums
Universal Music Latin Entertainment albums